The Kharkiv or Kharkov is a river in Kharkiv Oblast, Ukraine, a left tributary of the Lopan. It originates from the town of Oktyabrsky in Belgorod Oblast, Russia and it falls into Lopan in the city of Kharkiv.

The river Kharkiv may have given the city of Kharkiv its name. The river is also known as a place for people who enjoy cold-water swimming known as morzhei or "walruses" to swim.

Gallery

See also

References

Geography of Kharkiv
Rivers of Belgorod Oblast
Rivers of Kharkiv Oblast